KCHZ (95.7 FM, "95-7 The Vibe"), is a Top 40 (CHR) radio station licensed to Ottawa, Kansas and serving the Kansas City metropolitan area. The Cumulus Media, Inc. outlet operates at 95.7 MHz with an ERP of 98 kW. Its transmitter is located near Linwood, Kansas, and studios are in Overland Park, Kansas.

History

Early years
KCHZ first began broadcasting as KOFO-FM, an FM simulcast for sister station KOFO (1220 AM). The station signed on March 1, 1962.

In 1978, the station stopped simulcasting its AM sister station and flipped to a mix of Top 40 and AOR as "96X", with the call letters KKKX.

In 1986, the station flipped to easy listening/adult contemporary, branded as "96 HUM", and changed call letters to KHUM. The station relocated its transmitter from its original site near Ottawa to its current location near Linwood, upgraded its power to 100,000 watts, and relocated its studios, first to Lawrence, then to Topeka. In 1991, the station went silent.

In 1993, the station signed back on as adult contemporary KZTO, branded as "Z96." The studios were in Lawrence, near 25th and Iowa, with the tower southeast of the city. In January 1994, the station went silent again.

Channel Z/Z95.7
The 95.7 signal signed back on under the control of Radio 2000, Inc. on January 21, 1997, as KCHZ, "Channel Z95.7", a Modern Adult Contemporary outlet, after stunting with all-80's music and a heartbeat sound effect for about a week. This was the frequency's first attempt to target the Kansas City area. During this time, the station used the slogan "Kansas City's Superstation." KCHZ would gain a competitor in September 1997, when KYYS flipped to Modern AC.

By January 1998, KCHZ shifted to Top 40/CHR, then to rhythmic contemporary by 1999. During this period, KCHZ called itself "Z95.7 - Kansas City's Hottest Hits."

The station was sold to Syncom Radio in 1999, and Syncom continued to adjust the station's image. KCHZ shifted back to Mainstream Top 40/CHR in 2000, back to Rhythmic CHR by 2002, then back to a Mainstream CHR by late 2003, when Cumulus Broadcasting bought the station.

The Vibe
By November 2005, after years of confusing listeners over what direction the station was taking, Cumulus decided that 95.7 needed a complete overhaul. To bring attention to the changeover, KCHZ began stunting with all-Christmas music at Noon on November 1, 2005, as "Jingle 95.7", jumping the gun a week before KUDL or KCKC would even start broadcasting Christmas music. However, by the next day, the station shifted its stunting to a loop of "Swans Splashdown" by Jean-Jacques Perrey and "Lonesome Road" by Dean Elliot & His Big Band. At 5 p.m. on November 3, KCHZ shifted to Rhythmic CHR for a third time as "95-7 The Vibe, The Beat of Kansas City", with The Black Eyed Peas' "My Humps" being the first song played. During its tenure as a Rhythmic station, KCHZ aired a few syndicated shows, including "The Weekend Top 30 Countdown" with Hollywood Hamilton, as well as "Sunday Night Slow Jams" with R.Dub.

On January 27, 2009, KCHZ shifted the format to feature more mainstream top 40 hits and dropped the majority of its old school and hip hop hits, but still maintained its Rhythmic format somewhat. KCHZ continued to report to R&R/Nielsen BDS Rhythmic Airplay panel. This kind of direction has also sparked debate from radio message boards about stations that decided to add certain Pop and Dance tracks but stay within the Rhythmic realm.

By October 2009, KCHZ fully shifted back to Mainstream Top 40. This was part of Cumulus' plan to launch Mainstream Top 40 stations in major markets across the country. With the change, morning hosts "Shorty & the Boyz", who have hosted mornings since 2005, were let go. The station currently airs the syndicated "The Bert Show" in mornings from sister station WWWQ in Atlanta. KCHZ currently competes with KMXV, KPRS, and KZPT.

References

External links

Contemporary hit radio stations in the United States
Franklin County, Kansas
CHZ
Cumulus Media radio stations